Joseph Harold Grady (February 27, 1917 – January 9, 2002) was a judge and the mayor of Baltimore, Maryland from 1959 to 1962.

Prior to running for mayor, he was an FBI agent and state's attorney for Baltimore city.

External links

References 

http://politicalgraveyard.com/bio/grady.html#RNX02YEZ2
Time (magazine)

1917 births
2002 deaths
Politicians from Williamsport, Pennsylvania
Maryland Democrats
Maryland state court judges
Mayors of Baltimore
Federal Bureau of Investigation agents
State's attorneys in Maryland
20th-century American judges